Amy Ruley (born October 24, 1955) is a former women's head basketball coach at North Dakota State University. Ruley has the greatest number of victories of any women's coach at NDSU, with over 600 wins, and led the Bison to 5 NCAA Division II championships. She was inducted into the Women's Basketball Hall of Fame in 2004. She is a graduate of Purdue University, where she was a member of the first varsity Purdue Boilermakers team, scoring the program's first points.

On Monday, March 3, 2008, Ruley announced that she would step down as coach after the game that evening against Centenary College (La.) and remained at NDSU until August 2017.  She joined the Minnesota State University of Moorhead (MSUM) Foundation as Senior Director of Development for Athletics in 2017. She had since joined the Sanford Health Foundation in 2019, with plans to retire in February 2022.

Purdue statistics
Source

USA Basketball

In 1995, Ruley served as the assistant coach to the R. William Jones Cup Team. The competition was held in Taipei, Taiwan. The USA team won its first six games, but four of the six were won by single-digit margins. Their seventh game was against Russia, and they fell 100–84. The final game was against South Korea, and a victory would assure the gold medal, but the South Korean team won 80–76 to win the gold medal. The USA team won the bronze medal.

Awards
 1997 – Carol Eckman Award
 2000 – Inducted into North Dakota Sports Hall of Fame
 2001 – Coach Ruley received the United States Sports Academy's C. Vivian Stringer Coaching Award in recognition of her outstanding achievements as a coach.
 2004 – Inducted into Purdue Boilermakers Athletic Hall of Fame
 2004 – Women's Basketball Hall of Fame

Head coaching record

See also
List of college women's basketball coaches with 600 wins

Notes

External links
Amy Ruley profile at gobison.com
Amy Ruley named to MSUM Foundation as Sr. Director of Development for Athletics

1955 births
Living people
American women's basketball coaches
American women's basketball players
North Dakota State Bison women's basketball coaches
Point guards
Purdue Boilermakers women's basketball players